Prądnik Czerwony is one of 18 districts of Kraków; known as Dzielnica III (District 3), located in the northern part of the city. The name Prądnik Czerwony comes from a village of same name (first mentioned in 1105) that is now a part of the district. 

Subdivisions of Prądnik Czerwony 
Prądnik Czerwony is divided into smaller subdivisions (osiedles). Here's a list of them.
 Olsza
 Olsza II
 Prądnik Czerwony
 Rakowice
 Śliczna
 Ugorek
 Warszawskie
 Wieczysta
 Akacjowa

Population

References

External links
 Official website of Prądnik Czerwony
 Biuletyn Informacji Publicznej

Districts of Kraków